Inzagatuy (Inzagata) is a rural locality (a selo) in Dzhidinsky District, Republic of Buryatia, Russia. The population was 498 as of 2017. There are 11 streets.

Geography 
Inzagatuy is located 54 km northeast of Petropavlovka (the district's administrative centre) by road. Borgoy is the nearest rural locality.

References 

Rural localities in Dzhidinsky District